Aleksey Petrovich Maresyev (5 May 1916 – 19 May 2001) was a Russian military pilot who became a Soviet fighter ace during World War II despite becoming a double amputee.

Biography
Before joining the army in 1937 Maresyev worked as a turner and then participated in the construction of Komsomolsk-on-Amur.

In 1941, he graduated from the Bataysk Military School of Aviation. He began his flights as a fighter pilot in August 1941. He had shot down four German aircraft by March 1942.

On 5 April 1942 his Yakovlev Yak-1 was shot down near Staraya Russa, after which he was almost captured. Despite being badly injured, he managed to return to the Soviet-controlled territory. During his 18-day-long journey his injuries deteriorated so badly that both of his legs had to be amputated above the knee. Before the surgery he was lying on a stretcher with a sheet over his face and considered to be a hopeless case due to the extent of his injuries in addition to suffering from gangrene and blood poisoning. One doctor offered to operate on him and thereby saved him, but told him he would not lose his legs. Upon waking up from anesthesia, he was angered to find that his legs had been amputated above the knee. Desperate to return to his fighter pilot service, he subjected himself to nearly a year of exercise to master the control of his prosthetic devices, and succeeded at that, returning to flying in June 1943.

During a dog fight in August 1943, he shot down three German Focke-Wulf Fw 190 fighters. In total, he completed over 80 combat sorties and shot down an estimated 7 German aircraft. He was awarded the title Hero of the Soviet Union on 24 August 1943. In 1944, he joined the Communist Party and in 1946 he retired from the military.

Postwar 
In 1952, Maresyev graduated from the Higher Party School. In 1956, he obtained a Ph.D. in History and started working in the Soviet War Veterans Committee. Eventually, he became a member of the Supreme Soviet.

He suffered a heart attack on 18 May 2001 and died 16 hours later, just an hour before the celebration of his 85th birthday.

Remembrance

His story served as a basis for the novel by Boris Polevoy The Story of a Real Man and a subsequent film (1948) directed by Aleksandr Stolper, in which his name was changed to Meresyev. The novel also inspired Sergei Prokofiev's last opera The Story of a Real Man. In 2005 a documentary called Alexey Maresyev. The Fate of a Real Man was produced by Channel Russia.

In Omon Ra (1992) by Victor Pelevin, a Soviet military academy routinely amputates the legs of its first-year cadets to turn them into "Real Men" like Maresyev.

The Pilot. a Battle for Survival is a 2021 Russian WWII film written and directed by Renat Davletyarov, based on the real story of  Maresyev.

The asteroid 2173 Maresjev is named in his honor.

Awards and decorations 

Hero of the Soviet Union
Order of Merit for the Fatherland 3rd class
 Two Order of Lenin
 Order of the Red Banner
 Order of the October Revolution
 Order of the Patriotic War 1st class
 Two Order of the Red Banner of Labour
 Order of Friendship of Peoples
 Order of the Red Star
 Order of the Badge of Honour
 Medal "For Distinction in Guarding the State Border of the USSR"
 Medal "Veteran of Labour"

See also
 Gheorghe Bănciulescu – a Romanian aviator, the first pilot in the world to fly with his feet amputated
 Douglas Bader – a World War II Royal Air Force fighter pilot with amputated legs
 Zakhar Sorokin – Soviet pilot who flew with both feet amputated
 Ma Ning – a Chinese pilot and Commander of the PLAAF, inspired by the story to fly despite one leg shorter than the other

References

External links

 Story of a Real Man at Internet Archive (full text, English)
 Obituary in the New York Times

1916 births
2001 deaths
Burials at Novodevichy Cemetery
People from Kamyshin
Mordvin people
Russian aviators
Soviet World War II pilots
Russian people of World War II
Soviet World War II flying aces
Communist Party of the Soviet Union members
Russian amputees
Heroes of the Soviet Union
Recipients of the Order "For Merit to the Fatherland", 3rd class
Recipients of the Order of Lenin
Recipients of the Order of the Red Banner
Recipients of the Order of Friendship of Peoples
Recipients of the Medal "For Distinction in Guarding the State Border of the USSR"
Shot-down aviators
Soviet amputees